Disney's Aladdin franchise features an extensive cast of fictional characters.

The lead character of the series is Aladdin, who was originally a street urchin. During the course of the franchise, he starts living in the palace of Agrabah and becomes engaged to Princess Jasmine.

Appearing in Aladdin

Aladdin

Aladdin (voiced by Scott Weinger in most cases, singing voice by Brad Kane, portrayed by Mena Massoud in the live-action film) is a street child who ends up becoming the prince of Agrabah after meeting Jasmine in the streets and being recruited by Jafar to retrieve the magical lamp from the Cave of Wonders.

In the 2019 film, Aladdin is mentioned to have lost his parents when asked about them by Jasmine using the alias of Dalia.

Princess Jasmine

Jasmine (voiced by Linda Larkin, singing voice Lea Salonga, portrayed by Naomi Scott in the live-action film) is the rebellious princess of Agrabah, who flees the palace in revolt to her obligation to be married to a prince. While on the run, she meets Aladdin in the streets and later helps him defeat Jafar.

In the 2019 film, Jasmine is served by a handmaiden named Dalia.

Genie

Genie (voiced by Robin Williams in the first and third film, Dan Castellaneta in the second film, TV series, and Kingdom Hearts, Jim Meskimen in later projects, portrayed by Will Smith in the live-action film) is a jinn and is never given a proper name.

Following a contract dispute between Williams and the Walt Disney Company, Dan Castellaneta voiced the Genie in The Return of Jafar, as well as the television series, before Williams reprised the role for the final installment Aladdin and the King of Thieves, as well as for the character's own mini-series, Great Minds Think for Themselves. Jim Meskimen took over the role in Disney Think Fast (2008) and Kinect: Disneyland Adventures (2011) and currently voices him after Williams' death in 2014.

In the 2019 film, the Genie is shown to have his usual blue form and his human disguise. He does fall in love with Dalia.

After Williams' death in 2014, a dedicated drawing of the Genie appeared at the end of the first film on television programs.

Jafar

As Royal Vizier of Agrabah, Jafar (voiced by Jonathan Freeman in most cases, portrayed by Marwan Kenzari in the live-action film) was presented as the Sultan's most trusted and loyal councilman. Imperious, Jafar held passionate disdain for the head, and dedicated the latter half of his life to gaining ownership of a magic lamp containing an all-powerful genie—to that end, he would control cosmic power, to which he would use to overtake the Sultanate and the world at large.

The 2019 film depicted him as being a thief who rose up to his current station, Jafar's motivation in taking over Agrabah is to enact revenge on the kingdom's neighboring ally Shirabad, the homeland of the Sultan's wife and Jasmine's late mother, while conquering the other kingdoms.

Iago

Iago (voiced by Gilbert Gottfried in the most cases, Alan Tudyk in the live-action film) is the pet and sidekick to Jafar, and later Aladdin, after a reformation. The red-plumed sentient bird is comical and sarcastic, and appears as a sort of cantankerous counterpart to Aladdin's monkey, Abu.

Iago appears frequently as an antagonist in the Sega video game Disney's Aladdin, where he is usually to be found flying at a high level, although he is easily dispatched and de-feathered with one blow from a sabre or thrown apple.

In the 2019 film, Iago mostly talks like a parrot at different parts.

Abu

Abu (vocal effects provided by Frank Welker) is Aladdin's kleptomaniac monkey with a high-pitched voice. In Aladdin: The Series, he is a voice of dissent whenever he is dragged along on one of Iago's harebrained schemes, although the two of them go from enemies to close friends over the course of the franchise. The animators filmed monkeys at the San Francisco Zoo to study the movements Abu would have. The character is based on the similarly named Abu the thief, played by Sabu Dastagir in the 1940 version of The Thief of Bagdad.

Abu also appears in Kingdom Hearts and Kingdom Hearts II, playing a large role in the latter with his kleptomaniac habits getting him into trouble during Sora's first return visit to Agrabah.

He can also be seen in House of Mouse as one of the many Disney characters that come to watch cartoons. Abu is usually found in the audience, sometimes playing with Iago or dancing along to the musical performances on stage.

In the 2019 film, Abu is featured as a Tufted capuchin.

Magic Carpet

The Magic Carpet is an ancient carpet that was found by Aladdin in the Cave of Wonders' treasure room. It is a character without a voice, and expresses itself entirely through pantomime and movements. It is genderless, but is often assumed to be male by Genie and other characters. It is playful, as it reacts with Abu, intelligent, as it beats Genie at chess (and most other things), and helpful, as it helps Aladdin romance Princess Jasmine during the song "A Whole New World." It sometimes uses its tassels as hands and feet to accentuate its feelings.

The unique design of Carpet was solely maintained through CGI. Advances in CGI had progressed so much since animating the ballroom sequence in Beauty and the Beast, that the texture and pattern of Carpet was much easier to accomplish no matter which way it moved. Animator Randy Cartwright refused to resort to the anthropomorphic style of simply putting a face on a carpet. Instead, Cartwright used body language to make Carpet more flexible, and almost human. Computer artist Tina Price took Cartwright's outlined form and super-imposed the Persian design that could stretch, squash, and roll up without changing. According to film critic Leonard Maltin, this made Carpet's animation one of the best collaborations between traditional and technologically advanced animation to date.

It appears in episodes of TV series, both as a means of travel and a reacting character to the events of the stories. 

It is also in the Kingdom Hearts video game in the Agrabah world. Sora frees it, at which point it acts as a transport between the city of Agrabah and the Cave of Wonders. In the second installment, it plays a more key role.

In Walt Disney World's Magic Kingdom, there is a ride called The Magic Carpets of Aladdin in Adventureland, which simulates flight on a carpet. There are other versions of the ride in two Disney parks: Flying Carpets Over Agrabah in Toon Studio located at Walt Disney Studios Park in France and Jasmine's Flying Carpets in Arabian Coast located at Tokyo DisneySea.

Carpet appears in the 2019 film.

The Sultan

The Sultan (voiced by Douglas Seale in the first film, Val Bettin in the sequels and the TV series, Jeff Bennett in Disney Princess Enchanted Tales: Follow Your Dreams; portrayed by Navid Negahban in the live-action film) is Princess Jasmine's father and the pompous but kind ruler of Agrabah. Some aspects of the character were inspired in the Wizard of Oz, to create a bumbling authority figure.

In the 2019 film, the Sultan's personality is more serious compared to his animated counterpart, but retains the original's kind and benevolent nature. In addition, it is revealed that his wife comes from the kingdom of Shirabad (which Jafar sought to conquer), who was murdered prior to the events of the film, causing the Sultan to keep their daughter inside the palace for protection. At the end of the film, he steps down from his position as the Sultan and passes it on to Jasmine.

Royal Guards

The Royal Guards serve as the law enforcement where they patrol the palace and the streets of Agrabah.

Razoul
Razoul (voiced by Jim Cummings) is the Captain of the Royal Guards of Agrabah in all three films and the TV series. Although unnamed (on-screen) in the first film, his name was revealed in the sequel (he was named after layout supervisor Rasoul Azadani). He has a strong dislike towards Aladdin, but is extremely loyal to the Sultan and Jasmine and takes his job very seriously.

Razoul appears in live-action remake of the original film, portrayed by writer and actor Robby Haynes. This version appears as a minor character as a chief city guard in Agrabah. His role from the animated works is transferred to Hakim, who plays a larger role in the film in contrast to his minor role in animated predecessors.

Fazahl
Fazahl (voiced by Frank Welker, understudied by Jim Cummings in "Sneeze the Day") is one of Razoul's lieutenants. He is darkly colored and very fat, with a long mustache. His lines usually make reference to food.

Hakim
Hakim (voiced by Frank Welker in the TV series, Jim Cummings in "Sneeze the Day," Corey Burton in Aladdin and the King of Thieves, portrayed by Numan Acar in the live-action film) is one of Razoul's lieutenants. He is pale, very thin and slightly shorter than Fazahl. His lines generally put a pessimistic take on the situation.

In the 2019 film, Hakim is depicted as the head of the guards and the right-hand man of Jafar, but he becomes good at the end of the film, playing a similar role that Razoul played in the previous animated works. It was mentioned by Princess Jasmine when working to convince Hakim not to have the guards side with Jafar that his father had worked for the Sultan.

Nahbi
Nahbi (voiced by Frank Welker) is one of Razoul's lieutenants. He is pale and muscular-looking yet short in stature.

Rajah
Rajah (vocal effects by Frank Welker) is Jasmine's pet tiger who displays dog and cat-like behavior. Unlike Abu, he is not anthropomorphized, but is still able to understand human language and emotions.

Rajah appears in Ralph Breaks the Internet. When Cinderella asks Vanellope if animals talk to her, Jasmine is seen hugging him.

In the 2019 film, Rajah was seen with Jasmine and Dalia for much of the film. During the opening "Arabian Nights," Rajah slashes Iago with his claws because the macaw spied on Jasmine. He bites Prince Anders in the hand because Jasmine hated him and also because Anders called him a cat. He begins to bond with Aladdin when he's in his prince guise by licking his face. When Jafar becomes sultan temporarily, Rajah is imprisoned with the guards. After Jafar is defeated, he is present at Aladdin and Jasmine's wedding.

The Peddler

The Peddler (voiced by Robin Williams, singing voice by Bruce Adler) is a mysterious desert-faring merchant, travelling on camelback, who appears at the beginning of the original film, and later reappeared in the ending of Aladdin and the King of Thieves. The entire Peddler scene was improvised by Williams as the actor was put in front of a table with props, and started pitching them as products from a salesman's catalogue. He implores the viewer to 'come closer', a reference to actor Sydney Greenstreet's many film trailers. In the original ending of Aladdin, the Peddler, now a sailor, was revealed to be the Genie masquerading as a human (or having been turned to human, as suggested at the end), but this was cut from the final film. The directors of the film later revealed that the Peddler is still the Genie, despite the ending being deleted.

Outside of the films, he appears in Disney's Aladdin, selling extra lives and wishes to the player, while in Kingdom Hearts he is voiced by Corey Burton and he plays a major role specifically in the second game where his greed and shrewdness are presented.

In the 2019 film, the plans for the Genie being a mariner was used where he and Dalia have married sometime after Aladdin and Jasmine's marriage and they have two children.

Tiger God (Cave of Wonders)

The Tiger God (voiced by Frank Welker) is a giant head of a tiger made of sand and the neutral guardian of the Cave of Wonders. Its job is to protect the Genie's lamp and give it to those who are worthy while eliminating those who are not. The treasures hoarded inside the cave are used to test those who are worthy to enter as touching them will also cause the Tiger God to eliminate them as well. It was portrayed by computer-generated imagery, following reference drawings by animator Eric Goldberg.

In the remake, the cave has a lion head-shaped stone entrance, rather than a tiger head rising from the sands, and does not move except when swallowing unwanted visitors.

Gazeem
Gazeem (voiced by Charlie Adler) is Jafar's criminal minion, seen just at the beginning of Aladdin, used by his master to steal the other half of the scarab amulet used to summon the Cave of Wonders. Although his competence is called sufficiently into question for Iago to refer to him as a "bozo" and he does provide some mild comic relief, he admits to Jafar that he "slit a few throats" to get his prize.  As soon as his half of the scarab is joined together with Jafar's, it comes to life and flies off to the cave's location and they follow its magical trail on horseback. When Gazeem attempts to enter, the cave demands to know who woke it up, and Gazeem introduces himself. The cave warns him that only one man, the Diamond in the Rough, whom the cave does not identify, may enter. Ordered to proceed by Jafar, Gazeem goes a little way into the cave and breathes a sigh of relief, when suddenly the cave roars furiously and collapses. Gazeem frantically tries to escape, but although he is still very close to the entrance, the entire cave roof comes crashing down, presumably killing Gazeem in the process. Having lost his accomplice, Jafar realizes that Gazeem was not the Diamond in the Rough and sets out to find this particular man who can enter the cave.

In the Aladdin video game, Gazeem is the first boss (or perhaps mini-boss) that the player meets, where his defeat results in his dropping half of the scarab amulet necessary to allow Aladdin to proceed to the Cave of Wonders at a subsequent level.

Prince Achmed
Prince Achmed (voiced by Corey Burton) is one of the potential suitors for Princess Jasmine. After Aladdin (and Abu, after some hesitation) gave their stolen bread to a starving sister and her younger brother, the brother runs out in front of Achmed's horse as Achmed is on his way to the palace. The sister runs after him and lifts him up, but Achmed's horse notices her and rears up in surprise. Achmed screams "out of my way you filthy brats!" and attempts to use his bullwhip to lash the little girl, who is shielding her younger brother's body with her own. Aladdin intervenes, blocking the whip using his forearm, and insults Achmed.

In retaliation, Achmed publicly humiliates Aladdin by shoving him into a mud puddle and telling Aladdin that he is nothing but a "worthless street rat" and will always be one. The next day, he is seen furiously stomping out of the palace with his pants ripped and underwear showing, following an attack from Jasmine's pet tiger Rajah, yelling that he has never been so insulted. Achmed tells the Sultan to have good luck marrying his daughter off and it becomes clear he has no further interest in her. After that, Achmed is not seen again for the remainder of the franchise.

In the 2019 film, he is replaced by Prince Anders (portrayed by Billy Magnussen), a seemingly European prince (possibly from Scandinavia), far more friendly to Aladdin than Achmed.

Farouk
Farouk (voiced by Jim Cummings) is a rather obese merchant from a fruit stand. When he sees Jasmine giving an apple to a hungry boy without paying, he is about to cut off her right hand, but Aladdin stops him by claiming Princess Jasmine is his mentally handicapped sister.  Farouk is initially willing to accept this and let them go, but when he sees that Abu has himself stolen some of his apples, he realises, angrily, that he has been duped, but Aladdin and Jasmine leave before he can catch them.

He is last seen briefly during the song "Prince Ali" when the Genie says "bang a drum" and raps his hands against his paunch.

He later made several minor appearances during the TV series, selling fruit and water.

In the live-action film, Farouk is replaced with a tone-downed bread vendor named Jamal (portrayed by Amir Boutrous). He attempts to remove Jasmine's bracelet instead of cutting her hand off, after discovering her giving a bread to some of the impoverished children without paying for it, but Aladdin intervenes in the manner similar as in the original film and the outcome is identical to the former one as he also called for the guards.

Omar
Omar (voiced by Charlie Adler in the first movie, Rob Paulsen in the TV series) is a merchant who sells watermelons in Agrabah's market. During the first film, Aladdin and Abu manage to steal a watermelon from his stall. He appears as a recurring character in TV series.

Appearing in The Return of Jafar
Abis Mal (voiced by Jason Alexander) is a childish and incompetent thief who dreams of enormous riches and does anything he can to get money. His first banter with Aladdin causes him to become a determined enemy towards him. His name is a pun of the word "abysmal", which is a reference to the outcomes of all his plans. Abis Mal appears in the TV series as the most commonly-appearing main villain. Here, his villainous deeds revolve around power as well as riches and many of his plans involve the use of magical artifacts or legendary creatures. At least one such episode reveals that he has a distant ancestor named Abnor Mal.
 Abis Mal's Thugs are many unnamed thieves who follow Abis Mal. They first appear in The Return of Jafar where they are shown to apparently resent his leadership and even try to kill him at a well before being scared off by Jafar's genie form. Abis Mal's minions reappear in the TV series where, though still under the lead of Abis Mal, they are shown to be involved in a limited number of his schemes. The most prominent instance is in the episode "Air Feather Friends" where they use the feathers of a baby roc to pose as wind demons to rob Agrabah. Other episodes where Abis Mal is shown being aided by his henchmen (aside from Haroud Hazi Bin) are "Forget Me Lots" where they join him in infiltrating the palace with the help of a brainwashed Jasmine, "Lost and Founded" where two of them aid Mal in traveling back in time to change history, and "Smolder and Wiser" where he ordered them to attack Aladdin for spying on him. Occasions where Mal's men appear without their leader are typically at the Skull and Dagger, the cafe headquarters of Agrabah's guild for thieves and criminals, often referred to by Abis Mal himself as a "den of thieves". In both The Return of Jafar and their speaking appearances on the show, different voice actors have voiced Abis Mal's Thugs: Jeff Bennett, Dan Castellaneta, Jim Cummings, Rob Paulsen, and Frank Welker.

Appearing in the TV series
Amin Damoola (voiced by Jeff Bennett impersonating Peter Seller) is a clumsy, cowardly, and incompetent thief, who appears in four episodes. Amin always finds a way to cause trouble for Aladdin (and usually ends up in trouble himself). Some of these ways are stealing a magical glove, creating a large green frilled lizard-like dragon, and getting a bunch of magical tools from Mozenrath. In his last episode he was working for Mozenrath who realized too late a mistake in hiring Damoola; when Damoola is down to two of his last two magical tricks, Mozenrath gives him a simple choice: succeed in stealing the Sultan and become the greatest thief in Agrabah, or face Mozenrath's anger and be forced to serve him for the remainder of his life. True to form Damoola is defeated by Aladdin and Genie; an enraged Mozenrath did not take his failure too well, and it is likely that he possibly turned him into a mamluk, a zombie soldier, or something even worse as punishment. His first name (Amin) is common in Arabic, but his last name (Damoola) is a play on words referring to his insatiable greed. Amin is so incompetent as a thief that he is nicknamed "Butterfingers" by his fellow criminals. However, he dislikes this nickname so much that he is willing to start a fight.
Arbutus (voiced by Ron Perlman) is a sorcerer who only appeared in the episode "Garden of Evil". He has the power to make vegetation and flora immediately grow and manipulate them to his will. His name comes from the tree genus Arbutus. While not evil in nature, he has more in common with plants than with humans and sees most humans as enemies for killing his beautiful works of art for their crass purposes. He sees himself as an artist and makes most plants grow with the intention of creating something beautiful, even during battle. He is especially appreciative of 'living beauty' and while he prefers plants he is aware that other organisms such as birds and even humans can enhance his artwork. Many years ago, a younger Sultan came to the garden of Arbutus because he had heard that the most beautiful flowers grew there, to pick a flower for his bride. Arbutus did not attempt to harm the Sultan upon his entry, as he admired the beauty of the garden. But the sorcerer was enraged when the Sultan plucked a flower, effectively killing it. To allow the Sultan to go free he demanded that in 20 years time he be given the Sultan's most precious treasure. Desperate to escape and not fully grasping Arbutus' meaning, the Sultan quickly agreed and hurried away. Twenty years later, Arbutus came to Agrabah for the Sultan's most precious treasure — Jasmine. At no point in the episode does he make any attempt to physically harm Jasmine despite holding her captive, and even befriends her briefly due to her gentle words, her appreciation of his artwork, and the fact that she is named after a flower. Arbutus' only weakness is the rose on his lapel. Once it is cut off, he withers and dies, as does the beautiful garden which he created. Princess Jasmine explains to Aladdin that Arbutus is not evil, only "different", and she, Aladdin, the Sultan and the Genie replant the flower, which perks up, and a deep inhalation is heard, suggesting that Arbutus might still be alive.
Aziz (voiced by Michael Bell) is one of Aladdin's first adversaries in the series. He is a small and ugly man, later turned to a goblin-like creature who can use his breath for almost anything, including creating illusions and turning people into small slug-like beings. It is apparent in the episode "Destiny on Fire" that these powers come with a price, as throughout the episode, Aziz seems to have a short breath and eventually goes on fire.
Chaos (voiced by Matt Frewer) is a winged blue cat who desires that life be unpredictable, full of surprise and change. Chaos is an extremely powerful entity of whom both Mirage and the Genie are terrified. He is a fun-loving prankster and uses his power for antics and light-hearted harassment rather than evil. He does get angry and sensitive when people start giving him orders, and often warns them in a threatening voice not to do so. He also has a strong dislike of Fate, since the notion of predestination rubs him up the wrong way.
Eden (voiced by Valery Pappas) is a genie who is the Genie's girlfriend. She is first introduced in the episode "Some Enchanted Genie" and only appears in one other episode; "The Book of Khartoum".
Haroud Hazi Bin (voiced by James Avery) is Abis Mal's sarcastic and cynical right-hand henchman who often considers his boss' schemes ill-conceived. He is also the only one of Mal's henchmen who aids him regularly in his plans. His name is a pun on the sentence "How rude has he been?".
Mechanicles (voiced by Charlie Adler) is a mad scientist who always styles himself as "greatest of the great Greek geniuses". He makes complex technological robots resembling both insects (particularly beetles), and other arthropods such as scorpions, in a range of sizes from minuscule to gigantic. Though he dislikes it when things get messy around him.
Mirage (voiced by Bebe Neuwirth) is one of Aladdin's recurring enemies in the TV series Aladdin. A cat-like enchantress holding powers over illusions, dreams and shadows, her magic powers are enough to create a mirage of Agrabah, its people and Aladdin's friends.
Mozenrath (voiced by Jonathan Brandis, understudied by Jeff Bennett) is a young evil sorcerer and necromancer. Almost all of Mozenrath's power comes from a magical gauntlet he wears on his right arm. He is the third major arch enemy that Aladdin faces (after Abis Mal and Mechanicles). Mozenrath is just as evil as Jafar, with Iago once referring to him as "Jafar Junior", comparing the two sorcerers' ambition and cruelty. In the episode "Black Sand", Mozenrath was seen in Jafar's lab and Iago asked him if he knew Jafar. Despite their similarities, there is no connection between Jafar and Mozenrath. Due to the price of the gauntlet's power, Mozenrath's right arm has become completely skeletal, and it has implied that the gauntlet will eventually kill him.  He is the ruler of the Land of the Black Sand, this kingdom has naturally black sand, the sun is always blocked by clouds, and the only residents are himself, his flying eel sidekick Xerxes, and an army of undead Mamluks. He is quite open and accepting about his own cruelty, and he prides himself on his ruthlessness. He took control of the Land of the Black Sand from its former ruler, the sorcerer Destane. According to Iago, Destane was "a real hard case. Even Jafar steered clear of him." Mozenrath explained that Destane was like a father to him until he "stole his power and his throne", and even "stole his humanity", turning him into one of his Mamluks. Mozenrath's main goal is to become the world's most powerful wizard and to rule the other six kingdoms of the Seven Desertd. While he and his undead Mamluk soldiers have secure control over the Land of the Black Sand, they are not powerful enough to conquer the other kingdoms that Mozenrath seeks to rule. Because of this, his plots and schemes usually involve obtaining more magic and becoming more powerful. Before he can accomplish his goal of total despotic rule he must overcome the only two obstacles to his plan [Aladdin and Genie]. Through the course of the series he tried to kill Aladdin and his friends multiple times. He also attempted to capture the Genie several times to use his magic for his own purposes. Despite Mozenrath's determined and ruthless attitude, he seems to enjoy bantering and tormenting Aladdin and his friends. At his first meeting with Aladdin, he is polite and even friendly until he shows his lack of compassion for others. This is when Aladdin makes it clear he does not wish to work with Mozenrath. In subsequent appearances, Mozenrath often loses interest in his plans as soon as they are defeated and does not attempt to kill Aladdin after their battles have ended. His overall demeanor is one of boredom and impatience. After being defeated by Aladdin multiple times in the course of the series, Mozenrath's final appearance his magical gauntlet has physically exhausted Mozenrath to the extent that he tries and fails to take over Aladdin's mind and body and ends with him losing his gauntlet and being sent away in a giant balloon with his sidekick Xerxes by the Genie. Originally, in Aladdin and the King of Thieves, Mozenrath was the main villain, and the plot of the film was going to reveal that he and Aladdin were brothers. However, according to one of the writers of the film, the plot was changed because the development team did not want the film to be tied to the television series too much and were also unable to get in contact with Jonathan Brandis (Mozenrath's voice actor), which prompted them to change the storyline and move onto another one of Aladdin's relatives: his father.
Xerxes (voiced by Frank Welker) is a flying eel who is Mozenrath's loyal sidekick.
The Mamluks are blue zombie soldiers that serve Mozenrath.
The Mukhtar (voiced by John Kassir) is a reptilian humanoid, apparently the last surviving member of the race of Mukhtars, sworn enemies of Genies. Though Mukhtars would generally hunt Genies just for the honor, the last Muktar acknowledges that times have changed, and now he hunts Genies for gold. Like Genie, he does not have a specific name. He is often seen riding on a horned reptilian ostrich named "Saurus".
Saurus (vocal effects provided by Frank Welker) is a bipedal dinosaur-like creature with an eagle head and is the pet of the Mukhtar. He appears in "Genie Hunt" and "The Hunted". His name means "lizard" (hence dinosaur meaning "terrible lizard").
Phasir (voiced by Ed Gilbert) appears frequently through the series. His first appearance is in the episode "Do the Rat Thing", but he is not named or given any background until the episode "The Prophet Motive", where he is identified as Phasir, an old seer and powerful wizard who turned his evil giant brother Fashoom into stone many centuries ago. The end of that episode also reveals that he actually has a single eye like a cyclops, but he wears bands over his one eye which makes him appear to be blind. Later episodes, such as "Eye of the Beholder" and "While the City Snoozes" hint that Phasir has had dealings with Mirage in the past and they may have once been lovers.
Sadira (voiced by Kellie Martin is a sand witch introduced in the TV series. She is a street rat like Aladdin whom she becomes infatuated with after he saves her from Razoul and after learning sand magic shortly afterwards tries to use her magic to win over Aladdin's heart. Sadira later reforms after her third attempt and becomes friends with Aladdin, Jasmine and the others. Sadira also briefly appears in Aladdin and the King of Thieves attending Aladdin and Jasmine's wedding.

Other TV series characters
 Amuk Moonrah (voiced by Tim Curry) is an evil demon who is malevolence incarnate. He is depicted being 20 feet tall, having blood red skin covered in fur, the tail and legs of a lion, and the wings of an eagle.
 Saleen (voiced by Julie Brown) is a snobbish Water Elemental (specifically a siren, a type of mermaid) who hates not getting her way. Her goal is to steal Aladdin for herself and make him her merman prince of the sea.
 Armand (vocal effects provided by Frank Welker) is an octopus who is Saleen's companion.
 Ayam Aghoul (voiced by Hamilton Camp) is an undead sorcerer, obsessed with trapping Aladdin and his friends in the Netherworld forever. Aghoul is able to wield dark magic, controlling skeletal minions and tossing grenade-like explosive skulls as some of the ways he confronts his opponents. However, Aghoul is often sent back to the Netherworld in the end. Because of Aghoul's undead passion, Iago often nicknames him "Death Breath". His name is a comical adaptation of "I am a Ghoul".
 Queen Kimbla (voiced by Linda Gary) is an anthropomorphic kangaroo who rules a valley of anthropomorphic animals. She and her fellow anthropomorphic animals were distrustful of man until the day Aladdin fell into their valley while rescuing a koala kid from falling off a cliff. After Aladdin prevented a flood as a result of Iago taking one of the diamonds from the dam and had defeated Brisbane in combat, Queen Kimbla saw that not all humans are bad and that Iago is proof that not all animals are good.
 Sydney (voiced by John Astin) is an anthropomorphic spotted hyena who works for Kimbala. He serves as the valley's teacher. In the form of a wallaby, Genie was brought to Sydney's class by Brisbane as Sydney teaches his students about why humans are bad.
 Brisbane (voiced by Michael Dorn) is an anthropomorphic common warthog who serves as Queen Kimbla's enforcer. After Aladdin stops the flood as a result of Iago taking one of the diamonds from the dam, he fought Brisbane to the death. The match was considered a draw when Aladdin prevents Brisbane from falling into the spiked pit that they fought over.
 Shadow Aladdin was created by Ayam Aghoul, he originally is a henchman of Aghoul's shadow. When Aghoul is killed, Shadow Aladdin goes off by himself. However, as he looks for a new host body, Aladdin recaptures him.
 Riders of Ramond are brave warriors who fear nothing that crosses their path.
 Caliph Kapok (voiced by Tim Curry) is the disembodied head of a wizard who desires to have ultimate control over his kind-hearted body.
 Sootinai (voiced by Dorian Harewood) is a smoke spirit that only appeared in the episode, "The Vapor Chase"; it was originally composed of smaller spirits. When all of the spirits merged into one, they became Sootinai. Sootinai can absorb the smoke from fires, making himself larger and more powerful.
 The Al Muddy (vocal effects provided by Frank Welker) are an Earth Elemental race of subterranean mud monsters.
 Al Muddy Sultan (voiced by Jim Cummings) is the leader of the Al Muddy. He is a giant among them and is a bit of a gentleman, compared to his minions' hostile behavior.
 Thundra (voiced by Candi Milo) oversees all the world's weather. She is Iago's romantic counterpart. She appears in three episodes, "Fowl Weather", "Rain of Terror", and "The Love Bug".
 Malcho (voiced by Hector Elizondo) is a giant flying serpent who is an enemy of Thundra and (later) Iago and Aladdin, and is likely based on the Mesoamerican deity Quetzalcoatl. He appeared in "Rain of Terror" and "The Return of Malcho".
 Magma (voiced by Tone Loc) is a fire ifrit with the power to control the earth's temperature. Known as the Lord of Volcanoes, he is summoned by lighting the Candle of Magma.
 Frajhid (voiced by Dan Castellanetta) is an engaging and initially friendly ice ifrit possessing an ice palace.
 Nefir Hasenuf (voiced by René Auberjonois) is an Egyptian-themed imp with the face of a hawk and bat-like wings who appears in three episodes as the main antagonist. His greed rivals that of Iago, though unlike Iago he is more willing to endanger and betray anyone to get what he wants. In his first appearance in "Never Say Nefir," Nefir manipulated Samir to dance on Getzistan when placed in magic dancing shoes. Aladdin and Genie thwarted the plan and had Nefir and his imps dance in the same magic shoes. In "Mission: Imp Possible," Nefir manipulated Genie after poisoning Aladdin (with Iago accompanying them) into accessing a worm that spun golden silk. After the worm emerged from the cocoon as the imp-eating Mothias, Nefir fled while evading a three-headed winged lion. In "The Way We War," Nefir became the Sultan of Agrabah's war advisor and secretly caused a war between Agrabah and Odiferous whom he also advised. After Aladdin was found innocent of stealing Odiferous' Sacred Crock of Cheese, Nefir and his minions were apprehended and sentenced to rebuild Agrabah and refund everyone's money.
 Nefir's Imps are a group of four unnamed idiotic imps that work for Nefir. One has the head of a crocodile, one has the head of a hippopotamus, and two of them have the head of a common warthog. They possess super-speed and can build things very fast.
 Samir (voiced by Michael Gough) is a giant pink rhinoceros that was once controlled by Nefir to attack Getzistan using magic dancing shoes.
 Khartoum (voiced by Tony Jay) is an evil wizard imprisoned within his own book. His only hope of release is a magical gem called the Philosopher's Stone which contains the power of the cosmos.
 Dominus Tusk (voiced by Jim Cummings) is a giant minotaur who served as a frequent, albeit usually minor threat, and was often quickly disposed of by the heroes. He was killed offscreen by the Sultan in "Armored and Dangerous" and had his horns mounted as a trophy.
 Fashoom (voiced by Frank Welker) is a giant cyclops and Fasir's younger brother who has an eye of destruction.
 Ajed Al Gebraic (voiced by Jonathan Harris) is the Genie's old master, who is very greedy. He used up all his three wishes and sold Genie to a sorcerer for eternal life but not eternal youth. He appears in the episode "Genie Hunt" and his name is based on algebra.
 The Ethereal (voiced by Kath Soucie) is divine spirit strong and invisible that carries on herself mask and gown, second in power only to Chaos. She comes to Agrabah to judge if Agrabah will be saved or will be destroyed. She appears in the episode "The Ethereal".
 Sultan Pasta Al Dente (voiced by Stuart Pankin) is the ruler of the land of Getzistan, known throughout the Seven Deserts for their casinos, much like Las Vegas, Nevada.
 Queen Hippsodeth (voiced by Kate Mulgrew in the first appearance, Jennifer Darling in later appearances) is the ruler of the Isle of Galifem, home of the Galifem warriors. After being defeated by the Sultan in battle, she fell in love with him.
 Scara (voiced by Susan Tolsky) is an overweight "right-hand woman" of Queen Hippsodeth and one of the Galifem warriors, a goofy, comic relief character.
 Merc (voiced by Dorian Harewood) is the captain of a flying ship who appeared in two episodes: "Raiders of the Lost Shark" and "Beast or Famine". He also briefly appears in Aladdin and the King of Thieves attending Aladdin and Jasmine's wedding.
 The Beast is the gigantic, carnivorous shark-like creature that "swims" the sand dunes of the Seven Deserts, and is pursued by Merc in both "Raiders of the Lost Shark" and "Beast or Famine". The "beast's" ventral skin is encrusted with precious gemstones from its rest during its winter hibernation, making it a potentially valuable catch.
 The Rat People appear in the episode "Beast or Famine". They are demanded by the shaman to capture Genie so he can have his powers. They later have Merc as their leader.
 Shaman (voiced by Malcolm McDowell): This master of sorcery used fear to use the Rat People. He had them capture the Genie and kill the beast.
 Prince Uncouthma (voiced by Tino Insana) is the ruler of the barbarian land of Odiferous. While the city of Agrabah has an Arab theme, the people of Odiferous are based on the European Germanic peoples. He first appeared in the episode "That Stinking Feeling" as a suitor for Princess Jasmine, unaware that she was already betrothed. He went on to marry a woman named Brawnhilda and have a son called Bud. Prince Uncouthma briefly appears in Aladdin and the King of Thieves attending Aladdin and Jasmine's wedding.
 Brawnhilda (voiced by Carol Kane) is a woman that Prince Uncouthma marries.
 Bud (voiced by E.G. Daily) is the son of Prince Uncouthma and Brawnhilda.
 General Gouda (voiced by Ron Perlman) is Prince Uncouthma's military chief.
 Squirt (vocal effects provided by Frank Welker) is a small creature of unknown origin, he only appeared in the episode "Scare Necessities".
 Prince Wazoo (voiced by Jim Cummings) appeared in "Do the Rat Thing".
 The Sand Monster (voiced by Jim Cummings) is a monster made of sand. Sadira wanted the creature to do her bidding, but all he wanted to do was to "smash stuff".
Tyrannosaurus (vocal effects provided by Frank Welker) is a carnivorous theropod that lived in the Cretaceous period. A last known living Tyrannosaurus survived the KT extinction event for unknown reasons. It lived in a jungle as its habitat.
 Evil Aladdin and Evil Genie (the same voices of the original characters): They were creations of Chaos against Aladdin and the Genie to make them understand their forces. Shadow Aladdin is similar to Aladdin in appearance but whas red and black clothing as opposed to the true Aladdin's outfit of purple and white.
 Queen DeLuca (voiced by Tress MacNeille) is the former Queen of Mesmeria featured in the episode "The Great Rift". She wielded the Amulet of Khufu, which allowed her to use magic and grant others amulets of Khufu much like her own. When Aladdin breaks the Amulet of Khufu, Queen DeLuca is freed from its corruption.
 King Zahbar (voiced by Keith David) is the former King of Mesmeria featured in the episode "The Great Rift". He was turned into a hawk by his love, DeLuca, using the Amulet of Khufu. When Aladdin breaks the Amulet, he is turned back to his human form.
 DeLuca's Brothers (voiced by Jeff Bennett, Jim Cummings, and Frank Welker) are DeLuca's three unnamed brothers also wield Amulets of Khufu, only they were made by Queen DeLuca. They were imprisoned in those amulets until Queen DeLuca freed them. When Aladdin breaks the Amulet of Khufu, Queen DeLuca's brothers are depowered.
 The Great Rift: Featured in the episode "The Great Rift", This is a monster generated by the Amulet of Kufu, which feeds on the anger of its wielder.

Appearing in Aladdin and the King of Thieves

Cassim
Cassim (voiced by John Rhys-Davies, singing voice provided by Merwin Foard) is Aladdin's long-lost widowed father.

Long before the events of the first film, he left his wife and newborn son in Agrabah to find the legendary Hand of Midas so that he could provide a better life for the poverty-stricken family, not wanting to be looked down upon. Some time later, he fell in with the Forty Thieves, eventually becoming their leader (the "King of Thieves"), and incorporated a new law: never hurt the innocent. One of his goals is to find the Oracle that would guide him to the Hand. Eventually, Cassim's travels brought him back to Agrabah, having learned that the Oracle was inside the Sultan's royal treasure room, ironically on his own son's wedding day to Princess Jasmine.

Having his men create a distraction, Cassim infiltrates the treasure room and finds the Oracle, but is intercepted by Aladdin and the two fight, both unaware that they are father and son, and Cassim is forced to retreat empty-handed. After the incident at the wedding, Aladdin uses the Oracle to learn that his father is alive and finds him with the Forty Thieves, only learning there and then that he is their leader. He and Cassim finally meet when Sa'luk tries to mutiny and kill Cassim for their unsuccessful raid on the palace. Cassim avoids having Aladdin killed by having him fight Sa'luk. After Aladdin defeats Sa'luk by kicking him off a cliff (although he survives), Cassim states that the Code of the 40 Thieves is clear on this point and states that he is in.

When he tells Aladdin of the Hand of Midas and joins him in Agrabah, Aladdin had to talk Genie down when Aladdin introduced him, but unbeknownst to them, Cassim is still attempting to get the Orcale with Iago now helping him. Cassim and Iago found where the Oracle is, only for them to be ambushed by Razoul and the guards, having been alerted of their presence by Sa'luk. When the Sultan learned that Cassim is the King of Thieves, he had no choice but to have Cassim and Iago locked in the dungeon with a life sentence, with Cassim explaining to Aladdin that he cannot change who he is. With help from Aladdin and Genie, Cassim and Iago got out and left with the Oracle, but Aladdin refuses to accompany them as he wishes to explain things to the Sultan. Returning to Mount Sesame, he finds that Sa'luk had turned 7 of the 40 Thieves that evaded capture against him, believing that he sold them out (not realizing that it was Sa'luk who sold them out). Sa'luk then has Cassim call the Oracle to guide them to the Hand of Midas. The Oracle guides them to the Vanishing Isle, a castle fortress on the back of a giant turtle. Thanks to Iago getting away, Aladdin, Genie, and Carpet head there to rescue Cassim. Cassim and Aladdin fight Sa'luk over the Hand of Midas which ends with Sa'luk accidentally turned to gold. Now realizing that his son is the treasure of his life, Cassim discards the Hand of Midas into the sea and reconciles with Aladdin, finally freed from his greed. Cassim also showed up to indirectly congratulate him after watching his and Jasmine's wedding from the shadows, since the Sultan has only punished him with an exile and then is still a wanted man before his departure. He leaves too soon to travel the world for some time along with Iago, who thinks he's finally found a great companion.

In Disney Princess Enchanted Tales: Follow Your Dreams it is not confirmed, but since Iago has returned to Agrabah as his travels with Cassim at the end, even Aladdin's father is certainly returned. However, just like Aladdin and Genie, he does not appear since the main focus is about Jasmine.

While not appearing in the live-action remake of the original film, Aladdin's father is mentioned. While Aladdin explicitly states to Jasmine that his mother is dead, he responds that he "lost both his parents" when he was very little when she asks about his father, leaving it ambiguous as to whether or not he is alive in the remake.

Sa'luk
Sa'luk (voiced by Jerry Orbach) is the main antagonist of the third film. He is a ruthless, aggressive brute, and he seems to have pleasure in killing. Sa'luk is the right-hand man of Cassim, the King of Thieves, although he resents him. He is also shown to be a strong fighter.

After the incident at the wedding, Sa'luk tried to strike Cassim only for Aladdin to intervene. Cassim avoids having Aladdin killed by having him fight Sa'luk in an initiation duel. After Aladdin supposedly kills Sa'luk by causing him to fall into the sea, Cassim states that the Code of the 40 Thieves is clear on this point and states that he is in.

Though Sa'luk survives and makes his way to Agrabah. Sa'luk gives the hideout's password to Razoul in exchange for immunity from prosecution. This led to 33 of the 40 Thieves getting arrested, though a guard tells Razoul that the Sultan will not sentence them until after Aladdin and Jasmine's wedding. Sa'luk was displeased that Cassim is not among them (because he was not at the hideout around this time) as he informs Razoul that Aladdin's father is the King of Thieves.

Sa'luk heads back to Mount Sesame and rallies the seven thieves that evaded capture to side with him after convincing them that Cassim sold them out, not knowing that it was he who sold them out. When Cassim and Iago return to the hideout, they are captured by Sa'luk and forced to call forth the Oracle who leads them to the Vanishing Isle where the Hand of Midas is located. During Aladdin and Cassim's fight with Sa'luk, the Hand of Midas is tossed where Sa'luk touched the hand part instead of the handle and is turned to gold. His lifeless body then falls into the waters below. After the Vanishing Isle disappears back underwater, Sa'luk is taken along with it.

Forty Thieves
The Forty Thieves are a group of thieves and assassins that are led by Cassim with Sa'luk as his second-in-command. They make their headquarters in Mount Sesame by the sea where it can be accessed by saying "Open Sesame". That creates a path in the water to Mount Sesame. Cassim had a rule where its members are not to harm the innocent, much to the dismay of Sa'luk. Some of the minor unnamed members of the gang resemble many of Abis Mal's henchmen, as well as a couple of the unnamed thieves who appeared at the Thieves' Quarters on the TV show, though it's not certain whether or not these are the same characters.

The Forty Thieves are first seen when they crash Aladdin and Jasmine's wedding looking for the Oracle. They fled after Aladdin and his friends fended them off. After learning about Cassim being "trapped in their world," Aladdin finds the Forty Thieves' hideout and spies on them. When Sa'luk got tired of Cassim's rule and tried to attack him, Aladdin intervened and revealed to Cassim that he is his son. To evade having Aladdin executed, Cassim had Aladdin fight Sa'luk in an initiation duel. This fight was fierce until they end up on the cliffside where Sa'luk fell to his apparent death. The thieves pulled Aladdin up from the cliffside and brought him before Cassim. Cassim states to Aladdin "You killed Sa'luk. The Code of the 40 Thieves is clear on this point. You're in." The 40 Thieves then began singing "Welcome to the 40 Thieves."

Sa'luk is shown to have survived the fall and made his way to Agrabah. In exchange for amnesty from arrest, Sa'luk tells Razoul how to get into Mount Sesame to catch the King of Thieves. After Aladdin and Cassim left for Agrabah, Razoul and his guards show up. When Razoul forgets how the password goes, Fazahl quoted to Razoul that he thought the password he was told was "Open Sesame". This grants Razoul passage into Mount Sesame, which led to 31 of the 40 Thieves being captured and thrown in the dungeon. They were enraged at Sa'luk for selling them out and vow revenge on him, but he ignores this by closing the prison cell's window on them. Sa'luk realizes that Cassim is not among them as Razoul reveals that he was not at Mount Sesame. A guard interrupts them and tells Razoul that the Sultan will not be able to sentence them until after Aladdin and Jasmine's wedding. After stating to Razoul that Cassim is the King of Thieves (leading to the latter's arrest), Sa'luk heads to Mount Sesame and persuades the seven thieves that evaded capture that Cassim sold them out, although they were at first skeptical as they are aware of Sa'luk's resentment towards Cassim. When Sa'luk (now the thieves' new leader) and the seven thieves capture Cassim and Iago upon his return out of revenge for his apparent betrayal, they take their boat out to sea as they use Cassim to activate the Oracle to find the Hand of Midas. This takes them to the Vanishing Isle (a fortress built on the back of a giant turtle) as Iago escapes to warn Aladdin. After Aladdin, Genie, Carpet, and Iago arrive, they fight some of them before Genie attempts to keep the turtle from diving. When Cassim throws the Hand of Midas to the sea, it hits the Sa'luk's boat before landing in the water. This leaves the seven thieves working to survive their boat's sinking as they are left stranded in the ocean. It is unknown what happens to them afterwards.

Different voice actors have voiced members of the Forty Thieves: Jeff Bennett, Corey Burton, Jess Harnell, Clyde Kusatsu, and Rob Paulsen. Their chorus voices in the "Welcome to the Forty Thieves" song are provided by Scott Barnes, Don Bradford, David Friedman, Paul Kandel, Peter Samuel, Gordon Stanley, and Guy Stroman.

The Oracle
The Oracle (voiced by CCH Pounder) is an omniscient entity bound to a staff, who answers one question per person. It is being given as a gift at Aladdin and Jasmine's wedding. It is through the Oracle that Aladdin found his father.

After Cassim obtained the Oracle and was captured by Sa'luk, the Oracle was used to direct Sa'luk and the seven thieves that evaded capture to the Vanishing Isle. It is unknown what happened to the staff afterwards.

Appearing in Disney's Aladdin in Nasira's Revenge

Nasira
Nasira (voiced by Jodi Benson) is Jafar's fraternal twin sister who tried to resurrect him. She is the main antagonist of the game.

The Arachnid
The Arachnid, also known as the Spider, is a giant arachnid with a monsterious appetite and a boss in the game. He appears as a huge black and yellow spider monster with a yellow skull on her hindquarters.

Anubis
Anubis is a minor villain in the game. His sorcery is also the source of the restorative magic of four golden Serpent Idols, the very artifacts sought after by Nasira in her plan of resurrect her twin brother Jafar from the dead.

Evil Sultan
The Evil Sultan as he is called, is an evil monarch threatening to become the new ruler of Agrabah and a minor villain in the game.

Appearing in Disney Princess Enchanted Tales: Follow Your Dreams

Sahara
Sahara is Jasmine's late mother's horse who was the only one who could ride her. When Sahara was missing, Jasmine went looking for him and rode him back to Agrabah before her father noticed his disappearance. His name translates to "desert" in Arabic.

Hakeem
Hakeem (voiced by Zack Shada) is a servant boy in the palace stables. He looks like Aladdin, but his personality is different. He is a little worried that he has lost a horse named Sahara, which will lead to him losing his job, so Princess Jasmine promised him that she will return Sahara to him.

Aneesa
Aneesa (voiced by Flo Di Re) is Jasmine's loyal servant who works in the palace. She first convinces the discouraged Jasmine never to give up and tries her best. When Sahara went missing, she tries to distract the Sultan from going to the royal stables.

Sharma
Sharma (voiced by Tara Strong) is Jasmine's cousin. She bears a resemblance to Jasmine, who is supposed to look like her mother. She works as a teacher at the Royal Academy.

Appearing in  Aladdin (2019 film)

Dalia
Dalia (portrayed by Nasim Pedrad) is a character from the 2019 live-action film remake of Aladdin and the only main character not to have originated in the original 1992 animated film.

She is the handmaiden of Princess Jasmine and the only real friend Jasmine had in the palace. Dalia later becomes Genie's love interest and at the end of the film, following Genie being freed from the lamp and becoming fully human, Dalia leaves Agrabah with Princess Jasmine's approval to be with him. Since then, it was revealed that Dalia has married Genie and they had two children together.

Omar
Omar (portrayed by Jordan A. Nash) is the son of Genie and Dalia.

Lian
Lian (portrayed by Taliyah Blair) is the daughter of Genie and Dalia.

Zulla
Zulla (portrayed by Nina Wadia) is a market trader. Wadia describes her appearance as "More of a cameo" as extra footage was needed after filming had wrapped.

References

 
Lists of Disney animated film characters
Fictional Arabs